Mamadou Tangara (born 4 June 1965) is a Gambian diplomat and politician who has served as Minister of Foreign Affairs since 2018, having previously served in 2012 and from 2010–2012. Tangara also served as Gambian Permanent Representative to the United Nations from 2017–2018 and from 2013–2016.

Early life and education 
Tangara was born in Banjul in 1965. He completed two master's degrees, at the University of Limoges in France and the University of Louvain (UCLouvain) in Belgium. He went on to complete a PhD in social sciences from the University of Limoges also.

Early career 
Tangara was editor-in-chief of La Lune, a magazine published in French aimed at French learners. From 2002, he worked as a lecturer at the University of the Gambia, and then as president and chairman of the University Governing Council.

Political career 
From 2008 to 2010, he was coordinator of the National Authorizing Office Support Unit for EU-funded programmes and projects in the Gambia. He then became an advisor to president Yahya Jammeh regarding UNESCO.

He was appointed as Minister of Foreign Affairs by Jammeh in June 2010. He held the role until April 2012, when he was appointed as Minister for Fisheries, Water Resources and National Assembly Matters. Consequently, he was reappointed as Minister of Foreign Affairs in August 2012, holding it until November when he was appointed as Minister for Higher Education, Research, Science and Technology, in which he served until 2013. In 2013, Tangara was appointed as Gambian Permanent Representative to the United Nations. He presented his credentials to Secretary-General Ban Ki-moon on 13 September 2013.

In December 2016, during the 2016–17 Gambian constitutional crisis, Tangara was among a number of Gambian diplomats who called for Jammeh to step down peacefully. On 20 December 2016, The Gambia Echo reported that Jammeh had dismissed Tangara and replaced him with lieutenant colonel Samsudeen Sarr as chargé d'affaires. Tangara was reappointed to the role on 3 May 2017 by Adama Barrow. In a cabinet reshuffle, effective 29 June 2018, Barrow appointed Tangara as Minister of Foreign Affairs, replacing Ousainou Darboe who had been made Vice-President.

References 

Living people
People from Banjul
University of Limoges alumni
Foreign ministers of the Gambia
Université catholique de Louvain alumni
1965 births